Thomas Arthur Green (June 9, 1948 – February 28, 2021) was an American Mormon fundamentalist in Utah who was a practitioner of plural marriage. After a high-profile trial, Green was convicted by the state of Utah on May 18, 2001, of four counts of bigamy and one count of failure to pay child support. This decision was upheld by the Utah State Supreme Court in 2004. He was also convicted of child rape, on the basis that one of his wives had his child at the age of 13. The wife in question was his stepdaughter before they were married; she was the daughter of his first polygamous wife. In total, he served six years in prison and was released in 2007.

Religion
Green was raised as a member of the Church of Jesus Christ of Latter-day Saints (LDS Church). He served as a Mormon missionary in the church's Great Lakes Mission (Indiana and Michigan) from June 1967 to June 1969. In the 1980s while in his thirties, Green left the LDS Church and converted to a type of Mormon fundamentalism, which teaches that its adherents should practice plural marriage. (The LDS Church stopped allowing polygamy in the 1890s.) He eventually took seven wives. He was also a one-time apostle for the Righteous Branch of the Church of Jesus Christ of Latter-day Saints, a fundamentalist group that split from the Apostolic United Brethren, another fundamentalist group.

Trial and conviction
The prosecution, led by Juab County Attorney David Leavitt, alleged that Green married teenagers, divorced them, and then collected the welfare payments they received as "single mothers" while he continued living with them. Described as "Utah's first high-profile bigamy case in half a century," Green's trial attracted substantial national attention and some international media coverage.  His other wives also all refused to testify against him.

On June 24, 2002, Green was convicted of child rape for having sex with 13-year-old Linda Kunz, who ultimately was his legal wife. Kunz, who refused to testify against Green at the trial, was born in 1972, and gave birth to her first child with Green in 1986. Green had four other wives and 35 children in all. Tom Green was sentenced to five years in prison for the first conviction, and five years to life in prison for the second conviction. While he was in jail, one of his wives reportedly left him and took their children with her. Green was released from prison on parole on August 7, 2007.

Documentary film
Green and his lifestyle were the subject of the British-made documentary One Man, Six Wives and Twenty-Nine Children in 2000 at the New York International Documentary Film Festival.

Death
Green died from COVID-19 pneumonia in Salt Lake City at age 72 during the COVID-19 pandemic in Utah.

See also
 Polygamy
 Polygyny
 Short Creek raid
 Legal status of polygamy
 List of polygamy court cases

Notes

External links
 PBS Religion & Ethics: Polygamy  online companion to October 2, 1998, program
 Mormon reaction to media coverage of Thomas Green and his trial

American people convicted of bigamy
Former Latter Day Saints
American prisoners and detainees
Prisoners and detainees of Utah
People from Juab County, Utah
Place of birth missing
American people convicted of rape
American Mormon missionaries in the United States
20th-century Mormon missionaries
Mormon fundamentalists
1948 births
2021 deaths
Deaths from the COVID-19 pandemic in Utah